Jay Leslie Pennison (born September 9, 1961 in Houma, Louisiana) is a former professional American football center who played in the United States Football League (USFL) and the National Football League (NFL).

Early years
Pennison is a graduate of South Terrebonne High School class of 1979. He walked-on to the Nicholls State University football team as a tight end, but was subsequently moved to center. He had previously played the position in high school during his sophomore and junior seasons. While at Nicholls State, Pennison was named second-team Associated Press All-American during the 1982 and 1983 seasons.

Professional career
Pennison signed as an undrafted free agent with the Washington Redskins in 1984, but was cut late in the preseason. Also in 1984, Pennison was drafted in the thirteenth round (270th overall) of the 1984 USFL Draft by the Jacksonville Bulls. He played center for the Jacksonville Bulls during the 1984 and 1985 seasons. When the USFL folded in 1986, Pennison was signed by the Houston Oilers and went on to start all 16 games during the 1986 season. Pennison started 5 years on arguably one of the best offensive lines in the 1980s, with Bruce Matthews Hall of Fame Class of 2007, Dean Steinkuhler, Mike Munchak Hall of Fame Class of 2001, Kent Hill 1986–1987, Bruce Davis 1987–1989. The Oilers went to the playoffs 4 out of the 5 years that Pennison was with the team.

References
Nicholls State Colonels media guide

External links
Nicholls State bio
NFL bio
FootballDatabase.com

1961 births
Living people
Sportspeople from Houma, Louisiana
Players of American football from Louisiana
American football centers
Nicholls Colonels football players
Houston Oilers players
Jacksonville Bulls players